Redemption Road (also Black, White and Blues) is a 2010 American film directed by Mario Van Peebles and starring Michael Clarke Duncan and Luke Perry.

Premise 
In Tennessee, Bailey, a debt-straddled blues guitarist, is escorted across the state by a man named Augy so that he can collect his inheritance from his recently deceased grandfather.

Cast 
 Michael Clarke Duncan as Augy
 Morgan Simpson as Bailey
 Luke Perry as Boyd
 Tom Skerritt as Santa
 Taryn Manning as Jackie
 Kiele Sanchez as Hannah
 Melvin Van Peebles as Elmo
 Cassandra Lawson as Bailey’s Young Mother

Release 
After it played at film festivals such as the Nashville Film Festival and Hollywood Film Festival in 2010, it received a limited theatrical release in the United States on August 26, 2011.

Reception 
On Rotten Tomatoes it has an approval rating of 57% based on reviews from 7 critics, with an average rating of 4.5/10. On Metacritic it has a score of 44 out of 100 based on 5 reviews, indicating "mixed or average reviews".

Joe Leydon of Variety called it an "emotionally satisfying tale about a young man in need of a mentor and an older fellow in search of forgiveness."  
Duane Byrge of The Hollywood Reporter called it a "battling-buddy road movie [that] carries viewers on an entertaining ride into blues country." 
Kimberley Jones of the Austin Chronicle rated it 1 out of 5 stars and called it a mawkish melodrama sunk by Simpson's poor acting.

References

External links 
 
 
 

2010 films
2010 drama films
American drama films
American independent films
Films about music and musicians
Films directed by Mario Van Peebles
Films set in Tennessee
2010s English-language films
2010s American films